Tony's Pizza Events Center, formerly the Bicentennial Center, is located in Salina, Kansas. It includes a 7,583-seat multipurpose arena, meeting rooms and Heritage Hall, an 18,000 square foot convention center. It is home of the Salina Liberty of the Champions Indoor Football league, and is nicknamed Mid-America's Meeting Place. On February 22, 2017, it was announced that the name of the Bicentennial Center would be changed to the Tony's Pizza Events Center, effective immediately.

The City of Salina is the primary owner of the center. Spectra manages the center as well as more than 100 other public assembly facilities around the world.

A variety of events are held at the events center, including concerts, family shows, sport events, trade shows, and conventions. Annual events include: Salina Invitational Basketball Tournament, Salina Home & Leisure Show, Kansas State High School Activities Association (KSHSAA) 4A Wrestling, Basketball and Volleyball State Tournaments, National Junior College Athletic Association (NJCAA) Women's Division I Basketball National Championship, Mid-America Farm Expo, Shrine Circus, Tri-Rivers Fair, and commencements for Salina Area Technical College, Brown Mackie College, and USD 305.

The arena has been home to five professional sports franchises: the Kansas Cagerz of the United States Basketball League (1999–2007), the Salina Rattlers of the International Basketball Association (2000–2001), the Salina Bombers of the Champions Indoor Football league (2013–2015), the Salina Liberty, also of the CIF (2016–present), and the Salina Saints of the American Basketball Association (2016–2019).

History
The first concert at the center was the Osmonds, on June 2, 1979. The concert sold out, and there was a crowd of 7,300.

On February 22, 2017, the center was renamed from Salina Bicentennial Center to Tony's Pizza Event Center, described as "the largest pizza facility in the world.” A food service subsidiary of Schwan Food Company paid $1.2 million to receive comprehensive naming rights for 15 years.

References

External links 
 Official website

Indoor arenas in Kansas
Sports venues in Salina, Kansas
Basketball venues in Kansas
American football venues in Kansas
1979 establishments in Kansas
Sports venues completed in 1979